Kya Hadsaa Kya Haqeeqat is an Indian thriller anthology television show that was first broadcast on Sony TV from 16 August 2002 to 9 May 2004. The broadcast consisted mainly of small stories in a mini format. The show stars Pallavi Kulkarni, Rajeev Khandelwal, Hiten Tejwani, Smriti Irani, Gauri Pradhan, Cezanne Khan,  Ashlesha Sawant, Sumeet Sachdev,  Shweta Tiwari, Narayani Shastri and many others. The series used to air at 8 P.M. from Fridays to Sundays. The series went off air from 9 February 2003 to 16 March 2003 due to the live telecast of 2003 Cricket World Cup on Sony TV. Since 12 March 2004 to 9 May 2004, the series only used to air from 8 P.M. to 8:30 P.M.

Story

Episode 1-29

The story follows trials and tribulations of a gullible, young woman, Nikki, who leaves her hometown to start life afresh in a big city. Unfortunately, her unpleasant past follows her and she soon finds herself caught in a vortex of complex twists and turns and begins to fear for her own safety. She realizes that reality can be stranger than fiction. Nikki is stalked by a hooded killer who, one by one, kills everyone around Nikki. Eventually Nikki meets dashing police inspector Raj and marries him. He vows to protect her, but then she realizes one shocking truth after another — neither can she trust her new family nor can she trust her own as everyone has secrets to hide and hidden agenda. Left to herself, Nikki has to expose dark shocking secrets before the killer gets her.

Cast

1. Hadsaa (Episode 1 - episode 29)  
 
 Pallavi Kulkarni / Geetanjali Tikekar as Neonika "Nikki" Chatterjee
 Rajeev Khandelwal as Inspector Raj Karmarkar: Nikki's husband
 Sumeet Sachdev as Rohit: Nikki's boyfriend and fiancé
 Smriti Irani as Smriti Karmarkar: Raj's fake younger sister
 Vishal Kotian as Veeru
 Rohini Hattangadi as Kanchan Bai: Raj and Smriti's fake mother
 Dolly Bindra as Sweety
 Ravee Gupta as Jaya: Raj's girlfriend
 Naseer Abdullah as Vikas: Rohit's step-father
 Madan Joshi as Mr. Karmarkar: Raj and Smriti's fake father
 Tejal Shah as Garima
 Nilofer Khan as Shweta Karmarkar
 Smita Kalpavriksha Gupta
 Rucha Gujarathi
 Prithvi Zutshi
 Amrita Prakash as Neonika's younger sister 
 Sumein Bhat
 Digangana Suryavanshi

2. Kaali Shakti (Episode 30 - episode 47)
  Kiran Dubey as Avni
 Monalika Bhonsle as Shama
 Divya Khosla Kumar as Sameera
 Nikhil Arya as Kabir
 Zarina Wahab as Avni's mother 
 Durga Jasraj as Chandni/Chandaalika

3. Kash-m-kash (Episode 48 - episode 73)
 Ali Hassan as Kushal
 Poonam Joshi as Pragati
 Kanika Kohli as Niyati
 Namrata Thapa as Malini
 Ritu Shivpuri as Nisha: a ghost
 Sudesh Berry as Professor Chatterjee

4. Kaboo (Episode 74 - episode 98)
 Shilpa Saklani as Pooja
 Rakshanda Khan as Devyani, an evil spirit who is also Pooja's best friend
 Siddharth Choudhary as Vikram: Pooja's husband
 Vishal Watwani as Karan: Pooja's cousin
 Pratima Kazmi as Bhaarini Tantrik
 Neelam Mehra as Vikram's mother 
 Pooja Gandhi as Nikita
 Radha Krishna Dutt as Vikram's father 
 Madhumati Kapoor as Beeji 
 Nitin Trivedi as Guruji
 Sonia Singh
 Namrata Thapa
 Prabhat Bhattacharya 
 Harish Shetty

5. Kalpanik (Episode 99 - episode 111)
 Amita Chandekar as Reva
 Ishita Sharma as Deepti: A ghost
 Karanvir Bohra/Amit Sadh as Rohan: Reva's friend
 Jayati Bhatia as Malti: Reva and Rashmi's mother
 Chetan Pandit as Lalit :Reva and Rashmi's father
 Aparna Jaywant as Rashmi: Reva's younger sister
 Rio Kapadia as Kishore 
 Nayan Bhatt as Shobhna
 Tuhinaa Vohra as Ritu: Shobhna's younger sister
 Pratichi Mishra as Reva's paternal aunt
 Madhuri Bhatia as Sheela
 Vishal Sablani as Atish: Kishore and Shobhna's younger son
 Murli Sharma as Inspector
 Gajendra Chauhan as Pandit Ji
 Prakash Ramchandani

6. Kayamath (Episode 112 - episode 130)
 Hiten Tejwani as Natesh:A devil
 Mayuri Kango as Sakshi: Natesh's wife
 Prabhat Bhattacharya as Saket: Natesh's fake elder brother
 Urvashi Dholakia as Mohini/ Mahachandalika:Saket's fake wife
 Kali Prasad Mukherjee as Netri
 Shama Deshpande as Natesh and Saket's fake mother 
 Kamalika Guha Thakurta as Shalaka
 Kusumit Sana as Natesh and Saket's fake younger sister 
7.Karzz (Episode 131 - episode 141)
 Kiran Dubey as Nishitaa Nakul Kapoor, reincarnated version of Charulata
 Rohit Roy as Nakul Kapoor, reincarnated version of Thakur Rajveer
 Ashlesha Sawant as Sonia Amar Mehra, reincarnated version of Vaishnavi
 Ali Hassan as Amar Mehra
 Deepraj Rana as Rajvansh
 Sai Ballal as Mr. Kapoor: Nakul's father
8. Kabzaa (Episode 142 - episode 159)
 Narayani Shastri / Shweta Tiwari as Aashna / Aashu 

 Sandeep Baswana as Preet: Aashna's husband"
 Jaya Bhattacharya as Anita and Preet's mother
 Shabbir Ahluwalia as Jay: Aashna's college friend and obsessive lover
 Rohit Bakshi as Bobby: Aashna's college friend
 Sonia Singh as Neha: Aashna's college friend
 Kali Prasad Mukherjee as Netri
 Amit Singh Thakur as Anita and Preet's father 
 Sikandar Kharbanda as Nakul: Aashna's elder brother
 Rinku Karmarkar as Anita: Preet's elder sister
 Namrata Thapa as Nakul and Aashna's younger sister
 Madhavi Gogate as Nakul and Aashna's mother
 Preeti Puri as Kavita Hassanandani
 Malini Kapoor as Monica Hasssanandani
9. Khaall (Episode 160 - episode 176)
 Sumeet Sachdev as Rajeev Khandelwal
 
 Geetanjali Tikekar as Natasha: Rajeev's ex-girlfriend
 Sandeep Rajora as Ali: Rajeev's friend
 Vishal Puri as Karan: Natasha's elder brother
 Kishori Shahane as Karan and Natasha's mother 
 G.P. Kapoor as Mr. Oberoi: Niharika's father
 Madhumalti Kapoor as Rajeev's  grandmother 
10. Kab Kyon Kahan (Episode 177 - episode 190)
 Hiten Tejwani as Pratham
 Gauri Pradhan in a dual role as Mayuri, Pratham's girlfriend, and as Gauri, Mayuri's lookalike twin sister
 Cezanne Khan as Kunwar Sujit Singh: a vampire
 Manasi Varma as Jessica: Pratham's friend
 Nikhil Guharoy as Yash: Pratham's friend
 Ali Asgar as Professor Samuel
11. Kohra (Episode 191 - episode 206)
 Shabbir Ahluwalia as Kushal Jay
 Shweta Tiwari as Sunita Menon 
 Siddharth Choudhary as Vikram: As Sunita's husband (Ghost)
 Poonam Joshi as Piya: Sunita's best friend (later revealed to be her own younger sister)
 Kali Prasad Mukherjee as Inspector Mohan
 Vineeta Malik
 Sejal Shah
 Shravani Goswami
 Sal Balal as Guru Ji (Sunita, Piya and Radhika's father)

12. Kutumb (Episode 207 - episode 225)
 Mayuri Kango as Shilpa Uday Khanna
 Tarun Khanna as Uday Khanna
 Madhumalti Kapoor as Buaji
 Pracheen Chauhan
 Rasika Joshi
 Parmeet Sethi
 Sonal Pendse
 Tejal Shah

13. Kab Kaisey Kahan (Episode 226 - episode 252)
 Chetan Hansraj as Moksh Chauhan
 Shilpa Saklani as Tanu/ Rachel D'Mello: Indira's reincarnation
 Jasveer Kaur as Indira: Moksh's girlfriend
 Kishwer Merchant as Nikki: Moksh Chauhan
 Sachin Sharma as Purab: Tanu's best friend/fake husband
 Prabhat Bhattacharya as Shubho: Purab's father
 Urvashi Dholakia as Gayatri: Purab's elder paternal aunt
 Monalika Bhonsle as Deepika: Purab's younger paternal aunt
 Mukul Dev as Himanshu: Nikki's cousin
 Roopa Divetia as Tanu's maternal aunt
 Suchita Trivedi as a tarot card reader 
 Prakash Ramchandani as Deepika's husband

See also
 List of Hindi thriller shows

References

External links
Kya Hadsaa Kya Haqueet on SET Syndication

Balaji Telefilms television series
Sony Entertainment Television original programming
Indian horror fiction television series
2002 Indian television series debuts
2004 Indian television series endings
Indian anthology television series